Escadron de Transport 82 Maine is a French Air and Space Force squadron located at Faa'a International Airport, French Polynesia which operates the CASA/IPTN CN-235.

See also

 List of French Air and Space Force aircraft squadrons

References

French Air and Space Force squadrons